Athletics competitions at the 2007 Pacific Games were held at the Apia Park in Apia, Samoa, between September 3–8, 2007. A total of 45 events were contested, 23 by men and 22 by women. This year 6 games records were set (1 by the men and 5 by the women).

Out of the 135 medals given away Fiji won the most with 12 gold medals, 17 silver medals and 4 medals for a total of 33 medals. New Caledonia and Papua New Guinea tied in second, both winning 27 medals. The hosts (Samoa) came fifth, receiving only nine medals.

Medal summary
Medal winners and their results were published on the Oceania Athletics Association webpage by Bob Snow.

Complete results can also be found on the Oceania Athletics Association webpage.

Men

Women

Medal table (unofficial)

Participation (unofficial)
Athletes from the following 20 countries were reported to participate:

 
 
 
 
 
 
 
 
/ 
 
 
 
 
 
 
 
 
 
 
/

References

External links
Pacific Games Council
Oceania Athletics Association

Athletics at the Pacific Games
Athletics in Samoa
Pacific Games
2007 in Samoan sport
2007 South Pacific Games